Delirio de Grandeza (Spanish for "delusion of grandeur") may refer to:

 "Delirio de Grandeza", a song by Avalanch from El Ángel Caído
 "Delirio de Grandeza", a song by Justo Betancourt
 "Delirio de Grandeza", a cover by Rosalía from Motomami
 "Delirio de Grandeza", a song by Bobby Valentín

See also
 Delirio (disambiguation)